The 2020 Rio Grande Valley FC Toros season is the 5th season for Rio Grande Valley FC Toros in USL Championship (USL-C), the second-tier professional soccer league in the United States and Canada. This article covers the period from November 18, 2019, the day after the 2019 USL-C Playoff Final, to the conclusion of the 2020 USL-C Playoff Final, scheduled for November 12–16, 2020.

Club

Competitions

Exhibitions

USL Championship

Standings — Group D

Match results
On January 9, 2020, the USL announced the 2020 season schedule.

In the preparations for the resumption of league play following the shutdown prompted by the coronavirus pandemic, the remainder of RGVFC's schedule was announced on July 2.

U.S. Open Cup 

Due to their hybrid affiliation with the Dynamo, RGVFC is one of 15 teams expressly forbidden from entering the Cup competition.

Statistics 
 Source: us.soccerway.com

Numbers after plus-sign(+) denote appearances as a substitute.

Appearances and goals

|-
|}

References

2019
Rio Grande
Rio Grande Valley FC
Rio Grande